Margaret Seward MBE (22 January 1864 - 29 May 1929) became the earliest Chemist on staff at the Women's College (of which she was a founding Lecturer), from 1896 to 1915. She became the pioneer woman to obtain a first class in the honour school of Natural Science and later received an MBE for her work on nutrition during World War I.

Early life and education
Margaret Seward, daughter of James Seward, Master at the Liverpool Institute, was born on 22 January 1864 and educated at Blackburne House, Liverpool. She entered Somerville College, Oxford, in 1881. She was one of the first two female chemistry students, the other one being Mary Watson. In 1884, she was the first Oxford female student to be entered for the honour school of Mathematics. Seward then changed her focus to Chemistry, and in 1885 became the pioneer woman to obtain the first class honour school of Natural Science.

Career
Upon graduation, Seward was immediately appointed Natural Science tutor at Somerville, in addition to undertaking research with the Oxford chemist, W.H. Pendlebury. Two publications on chemical reactions resulted from her work, one of which was read to the Royal Society. These were a study on the reaction kinetics between hydrogen chloride and potassium chlorate and a study of this reaction in the presence of iodide ions. Seward was appointed as lecturer in Chemistry at Royal Holloway College in 1887, where she taught Martha Whiteley. She resigned in 1891 to travel to Singapore to marry John McKillop, an engineer. 

When she returned to Britain in 1893, she taught at several institutions including the Girl's Grammar School, Bradford and Rodean School. In 1895 she was appointed to King's College, Women's Department in 1896 to teach chemistry in the new chemical laboratory. She was described there as "one of the foremost women science-lecturers", but in 1912, King's College decided to appoint a male lecturer, and McKillop was reassigned to library work.

McKillop's position was terminated in 1914, and during World War I, Seward (by then known by her married name Margaret McKillop) worked in the Ministry of Food and wrote the book Food Values, What They Are and How to Calculate Them. She was awarded an M.B.E. in 1919 for her wartime studies on nutrition.

Political activity
Margaret Seward McKillop joined the Fabian Society in 1894 and was a leading figure in its Women's Group, serving as chair for several years.

References

British women chemists
British chemists
Academics of King's College London
Academics of Royal Holloway, University of London
Alumni of Somerville College, Oxford
1864 births
1929 deaths
Members of the Fabian Society
Members of the Order of the British Empire
Scientists from Liverpool